St Francis is a 1659 painting of Francis of Assisi by Francisco de Zurbarán. It was the only work by the artist known in France before the 19th century.

It seems to have been intended for a monastery in Madrid, before Maria Theresa of Spain gave it to the 'Colinettes' Franciscan monastery in Lyon. This had been founded by the marquis and marquise de Coligny in 1665. On the French Revolution it was sold to a Lyon painter and engraver Jean-Jacques de Boissieu and was used in 1797 as the model for one of his prints, Les pères du désert. A few years later, in 1807, de Boissieu sold it to the musée des Beaux-Arts de Lyon. Now, it sits in the MFA. It was long misattributed to José de Ribera, before being reattributed to Zurbarán in 1847.

Sources

Paintings of Francis of Assisi
Paintings by Francisco de Zurbarán
1659 paintings
Paintings in the collection of the Museum of Fine Arts of Lyon